The Baiyun Dam is a concrete-face rock-fill dam on the Wushui River in Chengbu Miao Autonomous County of Hunan Province, China. The dam serves to provide water for irrigation and to generate hydroelectric power. Construction on the dam started in 1992, the reservoir was impounded in 1998 and the project was complete in 1999.

See also

List of dams and reservoirs in China
List of tallest dams in China

References

Dams in China
Concrete-face rock-fill dams
Dams completed in 1999
Energy infrastructure completed in 1999
Hydroelectric power stations in Hunan
Shaoyang
1999 establishments in China